The 2017 Drivin' for Linemen 200 was the eighth stock car race of the 2017 NASCAR Camping World Truck Series and the fourth iteration of the event. The race was held on Saturday, June 17, 2017, in Madison, Illinois at Gateway Motorsports Park, a 1.25 miles (2.01 km) permanent oval-shaped racetrack. The race took the scheduled 160 laps to complete. At race's end, John Hunter Nemechek, driving for NEMCO Motorsports, would hold off the field on the final restart with four to go to win his fourth career NASCAR Camping World Truck Series win and his first of the season. To fill out the podium, Chase Briscoe of Brad Keselowski Racing and Johnny Sauter of GMS Racing would finish second and third, respectively.

Background 

Known as Gateway Motorsports Park until its renaming in April 2019, World Wide Technology Raceway is a 1.25-mile (2.01 km) paved oval motor racing track in Madison, Illinois, United States. The track previously held Truck races from 1998 to 2010, and returned starting in 2014.

Entry list 

 (R) denotes rookie driver.
 (i) denotes driver who is ineligible for series driver points.

*Withdrew due to different reasons. Friesen would withdraw to reorganize the team, while MDM Motorsports withdrew due to a majorly damaging a truck at the 2017 WinstarOnlineGaming.com 400.

Practice

First practice 
The first practice session was held on Friday, June 16, at 9:30 AM CST, and would last for 55 minutes.

Second and final practice 
The second and final practice session, sometimes referred to as Happy Hour, was held on Friday, June 16, at 11:30 AM CST, and would last for 55 minutes.

Qualifying 
Qualifying was held on Saturday, June 17, at 4:45 PM CST. Since Gateway Motorsports Park is under 1.5 miles (2.4 km), the qualifying system was a multi-car system that included three rounds. The first round was 15 minutes, where every driver would be able to set a lap within the 15 minutes. Then, the second round would consist of the fastest 24 cars in Round 1, and drivers would have 10 minutes to set a lap. Round 3 consisted of the fastest 12 drivers from Round 2, and the drivers would have 5 minutes to set a time. Whoever was fastest in Round 3 would win the pole.

No drivers would fail to qualify.

Full qualifying results

Race results 
Stage 1 Laps: 35

Stage 2 Laps: 35

Stage 3 Laps: 90

Standings after the race 

Drivers' Championship standings

Note: Only the first 8 positions are included for the driver standings.

References 

2017 NASCAR Camping World Truck Series
NASCAR races at Gateway Motorsports Park
June 2017 sports events in the United States
2017 in sports in Illinois